The Bahamas national rugby union team represent the Bahamas in the sport of rugby union. The team have thus far not qualified for a Rugby World Cup, but have participated in qualifying tournament. The nation is classified as tier three by the International Rugby Board (IRB).

History
The Bahamas made their international debut on March 22, 1997 in a match against Bermuda. Bermuda won the contest 24 points to 3. The Bahamas played Barbados that April, and in the process won their first international; defeating Barbados 37-23. The team played three internationals during October 1998; although the Bahamas lost all three games, against Bermuda, Trinidad & Tobago and Jamaica.

The Bahamas compete in the Caribbean Championship, a tournament which includes Antigua, Trinidad and Tobago, the Cayman Islands, Jamaica, the Bermuda, British Virgin Islands, and Guyana.

They played a one-off international in 2001, losing to Barbados 18 points to 25. Another international was played in June 2003, where they lost 7 to 13 to the Cayman Islands. The Bahamas took part in the Americas qualifying tournaments for the 2007 Rugby World Cup in France. They won their first two matches, defeating the Cayman Islands and Bermuda, but lost their third against Jamaica. However, they did finish at the top of the Northern Pool, clinching the play-off match against the winner of the other pool. The Bahamas lost to Barbados in the play-off match, 52-3.

World Cup record
 1987 - Did not enter
 1991 - Did not enter
 1995 - Did not enter
 1999 - Did not qualify
 2003 - Did not qualify
 2007 - Did not qualify
 2011 - Did not qualify
 2015 - Did not qualify

Squad
Squad to 2012 NACRA Championship 26 May 2012

References

External links
 Bahamas on IRB.com
 Rugby Bahamas
 Bahamas  on rugbydata.com
 http://www.americasrugbynews.com/2017/06/04/bahamas-back-life-big-win-dominican-republic/

Caribbean national rugby union teams
Rugby union in the Bahamas
Rugby Union